Castellar (formerly known Castellar de Santiesteban) is a municipality in the province of Jaén, in the autonomous community of Andalusia, Spain.

References

Municipalities in the Province of Jaén (Spain)